Dad's in Heaven with Nixon is a 2010 documentary film produced, directed and written by Tom Murray.  It concerns the history of the Murray family and especially of Tom's brother Chris Murray, a man with autism whose paintings of cityscapes, first promoted by family friend Gloria Vanderbilt, have garnered widespread praise.  The title refers to Chris' belief that his late father, who loathed Richard Nixon, is now friends in heaven with the former president.  Ranging over three generations of Murrays, whose patriarchs struggled with alcoholism and bipolar disorder, the film treats of subjects ranging from father-son relationships to the Great Depression, from the effects of divorce on families to the cushy lifestyle of the residents of Southampton, New York.

See also
Golden Clan, a non-fiction account of the Murray / McDonnell family of New York, by John Corry
Thomas E. Murray, the great-grandfather of Tom and Christopher Murray
List of films about Autism
Autism spectrum disorders in the media
Autism: The Musical
The Horse Boy
Recovered: Journeys Through the Autism Spectrum and Back

References

External links 

 The New York Times review
 Bloomberg review

Documentary films about autism
Documentary films about painters
Works about outsider art
2010 films
2010 documentary films
American documentary films
2010s English-language films
2010s American films
Films about disability